Small Town Crime is a 2017 American neo-noir thriller film directed by Eshom Nelms and Ian Nelms. It stars John Hawkes as an alcoholic ex-cop who discovers a woman left for dead on the side of a road and finds himself compelled to locate the killer. As he investigates further, he encounters several shady characters and inadvertently puts his family in danger. It also stars Anthony Anderson, Clifton Collins Jr., Michael Vartan, Caity Lotz, James Lafferty, Robert Forster and Octavia Spencer.

The film premiered at SXSW on March 11, 2017 and was made available to watch on DirecTV Cinema beginning December 21, 2017 before getting released in select theaters January 19, 2018, by Saban Films.

Cast
 John Hawkes as Mike Kendall / P.I. Jack Winter, an ex-cop now working as a private investigator
 Octavia Spencer as Kelly Banks, Teddy's wife and Mike's adopted sister 
 Anthony Anderson as Teddy Banks, Kelly's husband and Mike's best friend, who acts like a brother to him
 Robert Forster as Steve Yendel, Kristy's grandfather
 Clifton Collins Jr. as Mood, a hardened tough but gentle pimp who is hellbent on exacting revenge on whoever killed his prostitutes
 Michael Vartan as Detective Scott Crawford
 Caity Lotz as Heidi
 James Lafferty as Tony Lama
 Daniel Sunjata as Detective Pete Whitman
 Dale Dickey as Leslie
 Jeremy Ratchford as Orthopedic
 Don Harvey as Randy
 Michelle Lang as Tina
 Robyn Lively as Deborah Nevile
 Bart Johnson as Carl Nevile
 Stefanie Scott as Ivy
 Stefania Barr as Kristy

Production
Principal photography began in February 2016 and took place over 35 days in Utah.

Release
The film premiered at South by Southwest Film Festival on March 11, 2017. DirecTV and Saban Films later secured the North American distribution rights, and released the film on January 19, 2018.

Critical response
On review aggregator Rotten Tomatoes, the film has an approval rating of 79% based on 38 reviews, with an average rating of 7.3/10. The site's critics consensus reads: "Small Town Crime makes for a satisfying modern noir outing, largely thanks to the all-around impressive efforts of a solidly stacked cast led by John Hawkes." On Metacritic, the film has a weighted average score of 68 out of 100, based on 12 critics, indicating "generally favorable reviews".

References

External links
 
 

American crime thriller films
2017 crime thriller films
Films shot in Utah
Saban Films films
2010s English-language films
2010s American films